Marisa Rene Abegg (born March 14, 1987) is an American retired soccer defender.

Early career
She attended Lakeridge High School in Lake Oswego, Oregon.

College
Abegg played for the Stanford Cardinal women's soccer team from 2005 to 2008, starting in all ninety-one matches that Stanford played during her college career and scoring three goals.

Professional career
Abegg was drafted by FC Gold Pride at the 2009 WPS Draft. Despite being promoted from the developmental roster to the full squad, Abegg was deemed surplus to requirements at season's close by Albertin Montoya. She appeared for FC Gold Pride in 6 games.

In 2010, Abegg was picked up by Washington Freedom as a developmental player. In 2011 and 2012 she played for D.C. United Women of the W-League, and in early 2013 for the Gulf Coast Texans of the Women's Premier Soccer League. Abegg captained D.C. United Women in both 2011 and 2012.

On July 31, 2013, Abegg signed with the Washington Spirit as a free agent. She made a debut with the team later that night in a 3–0 loss to the Western New Flash.

She retired from the Washington Spirit on February 14, 2014. In total for the Washington Spirit she started four games out of five appearances, recording 409 minutes of total play.

Retirement
On February 14, 2014 Marisa stated her retirement from professional soccer. She has planned to put her education first and help people in need through healthcare.

Abegg is now working as the Director of Operation for Women's Soccer at San Diego State University. According to their website, she is entering her third season with the program.

Career statistics

Club career

International career

References

External links
 Washington Spirit player profile
 Stanford player profile

FC Gold Pride players
Washington Freedom players
Stanford Cardinal women's soccer players
Sportspeople from Anchorage, Alaska
American women's soccer players
1987 births
Living people
USL W-League (1995–2015) players
D.C. United Women players
Washington Spirit players
National Women's Soccer League players
Women's association football defenders
Soccer players from Alaska
Soccer players from Oregon
Sportspeople from Lake Oswego, Oregon
Lakeridge High School alumni
Women's Professional Soccer players